Old soul or variants may refer to:

Books
 "Old Souls", popular poem by Thomas Gordon Hake from The World's Epitaph (1866) 
 Old Souls (book), by Tom Shroder (1999)

Music
 Old Souls (band), Los Angeles band
 The Old Soul, Canadian indie rock band 
 Old Souls (Deaf Havana album)
 Old Souls (Make Them Suffer album)
 Old Souls, three albums by Factor (producer)
 "Old Souls", single by Jessica Harper as Phoenix from the musical Phantom of the Paradise 1974
 "Old Soul", track by John Scofield from Groove Elation